Wendy Jeal (née McDonnell, born 21 November 1960) is a female English former track and field athlete who competed in the 100 metres hurdles. She represented Great Britain at the 1988 Olympic Games. In 1986,  representing England, she won a Commonwealth Games silver medal.

Career
Jeal was born in Epping, Essex, England and was a member of the Harlow Athletics Club and then the Haringey Athletics Club. As Wendy McDonnell, she won the AAAs National under 15 75 metres hurdles title in 1975 and the AAAs National under 17 80 metres hurdles title in 1977.

As a seventeen-year-old, she won her first senior national championships medal in 1978, with third at the AAAs indoor 60 m hurdles. In 1982, she was second at the UK National Championships in the 100 metres hurdles. In 1985, now competing as Wendy Jeal and after several years on the edge of major championships selection, she competed in the 60 m hurdles at the IAAF World Indoor Games in Paris. She ran 8.34 secs to reach the semi-finals.

Jeal had the best year of her career in 1986. She finished third at both the UK National Championships and AAA Championships, behind Sally Gunnell and Lesley-Ann Skeete, and  ahead of 1984 Olympic silver medallist Shirley Strong. She earned selection for both the Commonwealth Games and the European Championships. The Commonwealth Games in Edinburgh proved to be the highlight of her career, as she won the silver medal for England in Edinburgh, Scotland, in a time of 13.41, behind Sally Gunnell and ahead of Glynis Nunn and Julie Rocheleau (later Baumann). At the European Championships in Stuttgart, she ran her lifetime best of 13.16 in the heats, to reach the semi-finals.

In 1987, Jeal finished third behind Lesley-Ann Skeete and Kim Hagger at the UK Championships and third at the AAAs Championships behind Sally Gunnell and Skeete, earning selection for the World Championships in Rome, where she was eliminated in the heats, running 13.44. At the 1988 AAAs Championships, incorporating the Olympic trials, Jeal once again finished third behind Sally Gunnell and Lesley-Ann Skeete, earning Olympic selection. At the Seoul Olympics, she reached the quarter-finals, running 13.32.

Throughout her career, Jeal finished second or third at senior national championships fourteen times, without winning. Her last top three result, was finishing third at the 1990 UK Championships.

Achievements
3rd at the AAAs National Championships 100 m hurdles (1985, 1986, 1987, 1988)
2nd at the UK National Championships 100 m hurdles (1982) 3rd (1984, 1986, 1987, 1990)
2nd at the AAAs Indoor Championships 60 m hurdles (1980, 1985, 1986) 3rd (1978, 1987)
AAAs Under 17 80 hurdles Champion (1977)
AAAs Under 15 75 m hurdles Champion (1975)

References

British female hurdlers
English female hurdlers
1960 births
People from Epping
Athletes (track and field) at the 1988 Summer Olympics
Living people
Olympic athletes of Great Britain
Athletes (track and field) at the 1986 Commonwealth Games
Commonwealth Games silver medallists for England
Commonwealth Games medallists in athletics
World Athletics Championships athletes for Great Britain
Medallists at the 1986 Commonwealth Games